Mottige Janus  is a 1922 Dutch silent film directed by Maurits Binger.

Cast
 Maurits de Vries - Janus Rechtsom, de Mottige
 Kitty Kluppell - Lena Doorn
 Meyer van Beem - Nathan
 August Van den Hoeck - Gijs Rechtsom
 Pierre Perin - Duvion
 Koos Speenhoff
 Frits Bouwmeester - Frans van Klarenberghe
 Marie de Clermont
 Cesarine Prinz
 Ka Bos
 Feiko Boersma

External links 
 

1922 films
Dutch silent feature films
Dutch black-and-white films
Films directed by Maurits Binger